Margaret Gakuo Kenyatta (born 8 April 1964) is a Kenyan educator who served as First Lady of Kenya from 2013 to 2022. She is the wife of Uhuru Kenyatta, the immediate former Kenyan president.

Biography
Margaret Wanjiru Gakuo was born on 8 April 1964 to a Kenyan father, Njuguna Gakuo, a former director of the Kenya Railways Corporation, and a German mother, Magdalena. She attended St. Andrews School in Molo, Kenya, and received a Bachelor of Education from Kenyatta University.

Social activism 
Kenyatta has voiced her opinion on a number of social issues in Kenya ranging from mother and child wellness, including a mother baby hospital unit named after her. Kenyatta has encouraged patients to fight cancer by early screening for breast, cervical and prostate cancer and tackling diabetes by encouraging a healthy lifestyle. Kenyatta is also a big supporter of numerous educational and charity programs in Kenya, taking part in the opening of WE Charity college in Narok county, and promoting conservation of historic sites and monuments.

Public opinion of her in Kenya tends to focus positively on the simplicity of her fashion and temperament, and negatively on her perceived timidity. Since the inauguration, Kenyatta has headed up a campaign, dubbed the Beyond Zero Campaign, to reduce child maternal mortality rates. On 24 October 2014, she was named Kenya Person of the Year. She is Catholic and serves as an alumna of the Catholic girls' school, Kianda School.

See also 
 Beyond Zero

References

External links
 Margaret Kenyatta

1964 births
Living people
Kenyan Roman Catholics
First ladies of Kenya
Kenyan educators
Kenyatta University alumni
Alumni of St. Andrews School, Turi
Kenyan people of German descent